St. Ignatius College, San Sebastian ("Donostia" in Basque), on the northwest coast of Spain was founded by the Society of Jesus in 1929 and currently includes pre-primary through the baccalaureate. It is also affiliated with the nurseries of the Servants of Jesus and of the Carmelite Teresiana Missionaries.

On 1 October 1929 classes began at San Ignacio de Loyola School in San Sebastián. The first lay director, Amaia Arzamendi, was appointed in 2009.

See also
 List of Jesuit sites

References  

Jesuit secondary schools in Spain
Catholic schools in Spain
Educational institutions established in 1929
San Sebastián
1929 establishments in Spain